Amasonia hirta is a species of plants in the family Lamiaceae.

The species is native to Brazil and Paraguay.

In Portuguese it goes by the common name mendoca and sangue de Cristo.

References

 The Plant List entry: Amasonia hirta
 Efloras entry: Amasonia hirta

hirta
Flora of Brazil
Flora of Paraguay
Plants described in 1891